Lazdijai is a small town in Lithuania located about  east of the border with Poland.

History
It was established by Sigismund II Augustus in 1570 and granted Magdeburg Rights by Sigismund III Vasa in 1587.
During World War II, Lazdijai was under German occupation from 22 June 1941 until 31 July 1944. On November 3, 1941, 1,535 Jews were murdered in Lazdijai, including 485 men, 511 women and 539 children
The perpetrators were members of the Rollkommando Hamann, local policemen and Lithuanian nationalists.

In 1990 Lithuania declared independence from the Soviet Union, and new check points between the borders Poland and Lithuania were established and Lazdijai became the center that oversees and continues to regulate these operations. It is the birthplace of Lithuanian politician and producer Arūnas Valinskas and of Russian-American composer and violinist Joseph Achron.

Gallery

References

External links

 The murder of the Jews of Lazdijai during World War II, at Yad Vashem website.

 
Cities in Lithuania
Cities in Alytus County
Lithuania–Poland border crossings
Municipalities administrative centres of Lithuania
Suwałki Governorate
Holocaust locations in Lithuania